List of US national Golden Gloves light flyweight champions
List of US national Golden Gloves bantamweight champions
List of US national Golden Gloves flyweight champions
List of US national Golden Gloves featherweight champions
List of US national Golden Gloves light welterweight champions
List of US national Golden Gloves welterweight champions
List of US national Golden Gloves light middleweight champions
List of US national Golden Gloves middleweight champions
List of US national Golden Gloves light heavyweight champions
List of US national Golden Gloves heavyweight champions
List of US national Golden Gloves super heavyweight champions

Golden Gloves
Lists of boxing champions
American sports national champions